Robert Paxton is an English international outdoor and indoor bowls player.

Bowls career
Robert is from Crediton, Devon and plays out of the Exonia club indoors and out of Crediton BC. and won the 2011 Scottish International Open. In 2013, he won two gold medals at the European Bowls Championships in Spain.

In 2015 Paxton partnered Simon Skelton when they won the 2015 World Indoor Bowls Championship Pairs title and the 2015 world mixed pairs title with Marion Purcell and he held a career high world indoor ranking of 2 in 2015. The following year he was runner up in the singles in the 2016 World Indoor Bowls Championship, beaten in the final by Nick Brett.

In December 2016, he was part of the triples team with Andy Knapper and Jamie Walker who won the gold medal at the 2016 World Outdoor Bowls Championship in Christchurch.

In 2018, he reached the World Indoor Bowls Championship open singles final losing out to Mark Dawes in a hard fought final. Dawes had been the player of the tournament and Paxton did well to take the final to a tie break. He was also selected as part of the English team for the 2018 Commonwealth Games on the Gold Coast in Queensland where he won a bronze medal in the Singles.

In 2019, he won the mixed pairs gold with Ellen Falkner at the 2019 World Indoor Bowls Championship. The following year he finally won the World indoor title after reaching his third final at the 2020 World Indoor Bowls Championship and was also selected for the 2020 World Outdoor Bowls Championship in Australia.

References

English male bowls players
1978 births
Living people
Bowls World Champions
Indoor Bowls World Champions
Commonwealth Games bronze medallists for England
Commonwealth Games medallists in lawn bowls
Bowls players at the 2018 Commonwealth Games
Bowls European Champions
Medallists at the 2018 Commonwealth Games